Port Washington High School is a public secondary high school in the city of Port Washington, Wisconsin and a part of the Port Washington-Saukville School District. The enrollment during the 2012–2013 school year was around 900 students, and enrollment during the 2013–2014 school year was 860 students.

Eric Burke served as the principal until circa February 2020. In March 2020 Thad Gabrielse became the principal.

Athletics
Port Washington High School participates in the North Shore Conference. PWHS won state championships in boys' cross country in 1933, 1956, 1957 and 1960, and in boys’ basketball in 1936.

Alumni
 A. Manette Ansay, author
 Alex Dieringer, state champion wrestler; NCAA champion while at Oklahoma State University; 2016 Dan Hodge Trophy Winner
 Andrew Vitale, 1999 World War II Essay Winner
 Josh Gasser, Wisconsin Gatorade Player of the Year; Big Ten All–Defensive team (2012, 2014, 2015)

References

Public high schools in Wisconsin
Schools in Ozaukee County, Wisconsin